OpenXR is an open, royalty-free standard for access to virtual reality and augmented reality platforms and devices. It is developed by a working group managed by the Khronos Group consortium. OpenXR was announced by the Khronos Group on February 27, 2017 during GDC 2017. A provisional version of the standard was released on March 18, 2019 to enable developers and implementers to provide feedback on it. On July 29, 2019, OpenXR 1.0 was released to the public by Khronos Group at SIGGRAPH 2019.

Reviewers of the 0.90 provisional release considered that the aim of OpenXR was to "Solve AR/VR Fragmentation".

Architecture 
The standard provides an API aimed for application developers targeting virtual reality or augmented reality hardware.  This enables developers to build applications that will work across a wide variety of devices.

The fundamental elements of this API are:
 XrSpace: a representation of the 3D space 
 XrInstance: a representation of the OpenXR runtime
 System and XrSystemId: a representation of the devices, including the Virtual reality or Augmented reality devices and controllers
 XrActions: used to handle user inputs
 XrSession: represents the interaction session between the application and the user

Implementations 

The Khronos Group maintains the list of OpenXR-conformant platforms and products.

Currently conformant OpenXR platforms are:

 Microsoft HoloLens 2 and the Windows Mixed Reality headsets  
 Oculus PC platform and the Quest/Quest2 devices, with full support OpenXR 1.0 added in July 2021
 Collabora Monado Runtime for GNU/Linux, with the release of version 21.0.0 in February 2021
 Valve SteamVR, since version 1.16 in February 2021 
 HTC VIVE Cosmos and VIVE Focus 3, part of HTC’s VIVERSE ecosystem
 Qualcomm Snapdragon Spaces XR Developer Platform 

Preview and early development releases of OpenXR are available for the following platforms:
 Varjo PC platform, with a first release in July 2019

Game and rendering engine support 

Support for OpenXR application development can be found in the following engines:

 Unreal Engine, with initial support in the 4.23 release from September 2019 
 Blender, with initial support in the 2.83 LTS release from June 2020
 Unity, with initial support in the 2020.2 release from December 2020
 Godot, with initial support in the 3.3 release from July 2021

Browser support 

 Google Chrome and Microsoft Edge web browsers both enable WebXR support using OpenXR by default using the Chromium code base

Roadmap 
After the release of OpenXR 1.0, progress will likely be driven through the development of extensions to the core API. This can be seen in the subsequent release of extensions for support of hand tracking and eye gaze tracking. 
As implementers and developers get more experience with the extensions, they could get integrated into the core OpenXR API in future releases.

Contributors 
The following companies are listed by Khronos as public supporters of OpenXR:

See also
 OpenVR

References

External links
 OpenXR 1.0 specification

3D graphics APIs
Application programming interfaces
Graphics standards
Video game development
Video game engines
Virtual reality